

546001–546100 

|-id=025
| 546025 Ábrahámpéter ||  || Péter Ábrahám (born 1964) is a Hungarian astrophysicist and a former director of the Konkoly Observatory (2010 to 2015), whose research includes the nebular hypothesis and the formation of stars. || 
|-id=049
| 546049 Zhujin ||  || Zhu Jin (born 1965), a Chinese astronomer and editor of the monthly publishing magazine Amateur Astronomer in China. He leads the "Popularization Working Committee of the Chinese Astronomical Society", and was the director of the Beijing Schmidt CCD Asteroid Program (1995–2002) and the Beijing Planetarium (2002–2019), respectively. || 
|}

546101–546200 

|-bgcolor=#f2f2f2
| colspan=4 align=center | 
|}

546201–546300 

|-id=275
| 546275 Kozák ||  || Danuta Kozák (born 1987), a Hungarian sprint canoeist, who won six Olympic gold medals during 2008–2021, and 15 and 17 gold medals at the World and European Championship, respectively. || 
|}

546301–546400 

|-bgcolor=#f2f2f2
| colspan=4 align=center | 
|}

546401–546500 

|-bgcolor=#f2f2f2
| colspan=4 align=center | 
|}

546501–546600 

|-bgcolor=#f2f2f2
| colspan=4 align=center | 
|}

546601–546700 

|-bgcolor=#f2f2f2
| colspan=4 align=center | 
|}

546701–546800 

|-id=756
| 546756 Sunguoyou ||  || Sun Guoyou (born 1984) is a Chinese amateur astronomer and a discoverer of minor planets with the Sky Survey team at Xingming Observatory . Sometimes credited as Guoyou Sun and G. Sun, he also discovered supernovae, novae, dwarf novae, variable stars, double stars and planetary nebulae as well as comet C/2015 F5 (SWAN-XingMing) in 2015. || 
|}

546801–546900 

|-id=842
| 546842 Ruanjiangao ||  || Jiangao Ruan, or Ruan Jiangao (born 1986), a Chinese amateur astronomer and a discoverer of minor planets from Fangchenggang. Sometimes credited as "J. Ruan", he also discovered supernovae, novae in M31 and M33, C/2009 G1 (STEREO), and more than 80 other SOHO comets. || 
|-id=843
| 546843 Xuzhijian ||  || Xu Zhijian (born 1989), a Chinese amateur astronomer and a discoverer of minor planets from Nanjing. Sometimes credited as "Z. Xu", he also discovered supernovae, novae in M31 and M81, and more than 300 SOHO comets. He has also co-founded the Nanjing Amateur Astronomers Association. || 
|-id=844
| 546844 Jinzhangwei ||  || Jin Zhangwei (born 1968), a Chinese amateur astronomer and a discoverer of minor planets from Ningbo, who is a member of the Sky Survey team at Xingming Observatory . Sometimes credited as Zhang-Wei Jin ("Z.-W. Jin" and "Z. Jin"), he also discovered supernovae and several SOHO comets. || 
|-id=845
| 546845 Wulumuqiyizhong ||  || The No.1 Senior High School of Ürümqi (Wulumuqiyizhong) located in the Xinjiang Uyghur Autonomous Region of China. In 2021, this asteroid was named on the occasion of the 130th anniversary of the school's founding. Several minor planets, including this one, have been discovered at the Xingming Observatory  with telescopes from this school. || 
|}

546901–547000 

|-bgcolor=#f2f2f2
| colspan=4 align=center | 
|}

References 

546001-547000